GFM may refer to:

 Gas forming myonecrosis, a synonym for gas gangrene
 German Musicological Society (German: Gesellschaft für Musikforschung)
 GFM cloche, a defensive armament on the Maginot Line
 GitHub Flavored Markdown
 Gloucester FM, an English radio station
 Gruyère–Fribourg–Morat railway, a Swiss railway
 GoFundMe, a popular crowdfunding website
 Government-Furnished Materials, a term of art for materials furnished by the US federal government to fulfill contract obligations under Federal Acquisition Regulations